Adam Ward Rome is an American environmental historian. In his book Bulldozer in the Countryside, he examines how the post World War II residential construction boom and its resulting urban sprawl contributed to the rise of the modern environmental movement.

Life
Rome graduated from Yale University summa cum laude, studied at Oxford University as a Rhodes Scholar, and earned his Ph.D. from the University of Kansas. 
From 2002 - 2005 he edited Environmental History.
He is a professor of environment and sustainability at the University at Buffalo.

Awards
 2002 Frederick Jackson Turner Award
 2003 Lewis Mumford Award

Works
The Genius of Earth Day: How a 1970 Teach-In Unexpectedly Made the First Green Generation, Hill and Wang, 2013,

References

External links
""Give Earth a Chance": The Environmental Movement and the Sixties", Journal of American History, September 2003
"Earth Day 1970: Gaylord Nelson and the Making of the First Environmental Generation", University of Virginia, October 23, 2009 
"The 22nd annual Prairie Festival — Celebrating 25 Years", The Land Institute

21st-century American historians
21st-century American male writers
Loomis Chaffee School alumni
Yale University alumni
University of Kansas alumni
Pennsylvania State University faculty
American Rhodes Scholars
Living people
Environmental historians
University at Buffalo faculty
American male non-fiction writers
1970 births